Religion in Latin America is characterized by the historical predominance of Catholic Christianity, increasing Protestant influence, as well as by the presence of Irreligion. According to survey data from Statista 2018, 58.7% of the Latin American population is Catholic and 19,5% is Protestant, rising to 22% in Brazil and over 40% in much of Central America.

Christianity

The majority of Latin Americans are Christians (90%), mostly Roman Catholics. Membership in Protestant denominations is increasing, particularly in Brazil, Honduras, Guatemala, Nicaragua, El Salvador and Puerto Rico. In particular, Pentecostalism has experienced massive growth. This movement is increasingly attracting Latin America's middle classes. Anglicanism also has a long and growing presence in Latin America.

According to the detailed Pew Research Center multi-country survey in 2014, 69% of the Latin American population is Catholic and 19% is Protestant, rising to 22% in Brazil and over 40% in much of Central America. More than half of these are converts. According to the 2014 Pew survey, the 46 countries and territories of Latin America and the Caribbean comprised, in absolute terms, the world's second-largest Christian population (24%; including U.S., British, Dutch and French territories), after the 50 countries and territories of Europe (26%; including Russia, excluding Turkey), but just before the 51 countries and territories of Sub-Saharan Africa (24%; including Mauritania, excluding Sudan).

Indigenous and Afro-Latin creeds
Indigenous creeds and rituals are still practiced in countries with large percentages of Amerindians, such as Bolivia, Guatemala, Mexico, and Peru. Various Afro-Latin American traditions such as Santería, Candomblé, Umbanda, Macumba, and tribal-voodoo religions are also practiced, mainly in Cuba, Brazil, and Haiti.

Other world religions

Argentina hosts the largest communities of both Jews (180,000-300,000) and Muslims (500,000-600,000) in Latin America.
Brazil is the country with more practitioners in the world of Allan Kardec's Spiritism. Practitioners of Judaism, Mormonism, Jehovah's Witnesses, Buddhism, Islam, Hinduism, Bahá'í Faith, and Shinto are also present in Latin America.

Statistics

CID-Gallup 2010

2014 Pew Research Center data

Beliefs

Number of followers by country (2015 Pew Research Center projections for 2020)

See also

Religion in Argentina
Religion in Bolivia
Religion in Brazil
Religion in Chile
Religion in Colombia
Religion in Costa Rica
Religion in Cuba
Religion in the Dominican Republic
Religion in Ecuador
Religion in El Salvador
Religion in Guatemala
Religion in Haiti
Religion in Honduras
Religion in Mexico
Religion in Nicaragua
Religion in Panama
Religion in Paraguay
Religion in Puerto Rico
Religion in Uruguay
Religion in Venezuela
Irreligion in Latin America

References

Further reading
 
 D'Antonio, William V., and Frederick B. Pike, jt. eds. Religion, Revolution, and Reform: New Forces for Change in Latin America. New York: F.A. Praeger, 1964

Latin American culture
Religion in South America